Shahjahanpur Junction Railway Station  (station code SPN) is a main railway station in Shahjahanpur district in the Indian state of Uttar Pradesh.

Nearby stations 
SPN/Shahjahanpur (1 km)
SXK/Shahjahanpur Kutchery Halt (2 km)  
SZN/Shahbaznagar (4 km)
ROZA –  (8 km) 
TTilhar railway station (18Km) 
(18 km)
KIE/Khiria Khurd (11 km)
PRPM/Pt Ram Prasad Bismil (12 km)
BHDH/Bahadurpur Halt (12 km)
BRTA/Bartara (16 km)
ARX/Areli (16 km)
Hardoi Railway Station (63 KM)

Major trains 
Kanpur Central Kathgodam Express
Kathgodam Kanpur Central Express
Anand Vihar Trm Garib Rath
Muzaffarpur Jn Garib Rath
Lucknow Mail
Chandigarh Express
Shramjevi N Express
New Delhi AC Superfast
Jammu Tawi Express
Mour Dhwaj Express
Amar Nath Express
Doon Express
Bagh Express
Amritsar Express
Kolkata Express
Gangasutlej Express
Sadbhavana Express
Satyagraha Express
Sultanpur Express
Faizabad Jn Delhi Express
Padmavat Express
Varanasi Jn Bareilly Express
Kashi V Express
Prayag Bareilly Express
Nauchandi Express
Saryu Yamuna Express
Shaheed Express
Lucknow Ne Chandigarh Express
Tribeni Express
Lok Nayak Express
Rajya Rani Express

References

Shahjahanpur
Moradabad railway division
Railway stations in Shahjahanpur district